Try Too Hard  is the eighth American album by the English rock band the Dave Clark Five. It was released in May 1966 on the Epic label. It followed the Top 20 hit of the same name. The album reached No. 77 on the Billboard 200 album chart and No. 25 in Cashbox.

Background
At a time when rival groups such as the Beatles, the Rolling Stones and the Beach Boys were increasingly experimenting with sound in the recording studio, the Dave Clark Five also offered a sonically modern album. It tried to combine rock songs with edgy guitar ("I Really Love You", "It Don't Feel Good") with sophisticated melodies in different genre styles ("Looking In", "Ever Since You've Been Away", "Today").

Artwork
The album cover art shows the band in a Jaguar E-Type owned by Dave Clark. He also appeared with the same car in the Catch Us If You Can movie and the band posing in the car on the cover of the UK soundtrack album from that film.

Release and reception

The album was released in May 1966 in mono and stereo versions. The electronically re-channeled stereo version makes the whole album sound more psychedelic. But Dave Clark was not happy with the label when he found out since it was originally recorded in true stereo. Try Too Hard album was less successful than its predecessors, being the band's first album not to make the Top 50 Billboard LP Charts, but still hit No. 77.

The album has not been released in the UK. In Canada, it was retitled "At the Scene" and included a hit single of the same name. 

In his AllMusic retrospective review of the release, Bruce Eder wrote, "DC5 would allow their music to evolve. From the crisp piano chords and lean, restrained guitar and sax sound, as well as the upbeat tone of Try Too Hard there was change in the air from the opening seconds of this LP."

Track listing

Personnel
The Dave Clark Five
Dave Clark - drums, backing vocals
Mike Smith - keyboards, lead vocals
Lenny Davidson - electric guitars, backing vocals
Rick Huxley - bass guitar, backing vocals
Denis Payton - tenor saxophone,  backing vocals

References

The Dave Clark Five albums
1966 albums
Epic Records albums